Jiří Korn (born May 17, 1949 in Prague, Czechoslovakia) is a Czech recording artist and actor. Korn is a highly acclaimed musician in his native Czechoslovakia, and remains after his five decade long career one of the most prominent Czech singer-songwriters, but is internationally perhaps best known for his single Miss Moskva, which received radio play in most European countries, including France, Germany, Croatia, Hungary and Norway.

Biography
Jiří Korn began his music career with the rock band Rebels in its 1967 establishment. The group disbanded in 1970; one album, Šípková Růženka, was released during this period.

In the early 1970s Korn joined the band Olympic. He also became a solo artist and released his first album LP 01. His single Yvetta (1972), written by Karel Svoboda, became his first solo hit. In 1977 and 1978, Korn was 3rd and 2nd place respectively in the Zlatý slavík music poll of popular Czechoslovakia music artists, which was frequently topped by Karel Gott. Korn performed several tracks with Helena Vondráčková such as "Tančit Prý Je Krásné" and "Slunce". In 1985, composer Michael Kocáb wrote the tracks "Karel nese asi čaj" and "Nejdřív je trénink" for Korn to record.

In 1990, Korn established Krach, a performing arts agency. He played Monsieur Thénardier in the Czech production of Les Misérables in Prague's Vinohrady Theatre in 1992, a role he reprised in the Goja Music Hall in Výstaviště Prague in 2003. Korn's 2003 performance in Les Misérables awarded him the Thalia Awards category of male musical actors. In 1995, he performed in the Czech Dracula musical. Other stage productions he played include The Count of Monte Cristo (2000), Golem (2006), Carmen (2008), and Jesus Christ Superstar (2010).

Korn acted in several films and television shows, such as Honza málem králem, Anděl s ďáblem v těle, 2Bobule, and Expozitura.

Korn had his own brand of perfume, ON LINE, in 2000.

Personal life
Jiří Korn was married to Hana Buštíková, a member of the Kamélie musical duo. He later married actress Kateřina Kornová, whom he also divorced. He has a son and daughter from the second marriage. In October 2017, he married Renata Cieslerová, whom he met while golfing.

Discography

Albums

LP 01
LP 02
Zpívat jako déšť

References

External links
 Website
 4TET Website

1949 births
Czech male stage actors
Czech male film actors
Czech male television actors
20th-century Czech male singers
Living people
Male actors from Prague
Musicians from Prague
21st-century Czech male singers
Czechoslovak male singers
Recipients of the Thalia Award